La Gaulette State Secondary School (commonly known as LGSSS) is the last state school providing co-education in Mauritius and is situated in La Gaulette Village in the South West of the country, Mauritius. It serves nearly 250 students annually.

See also
 List of secondary schools in Mauritius 
 Education in Mauritius

Educational institutions established in 2003
2003 establishments in Mauritius
Secondary schools in Mauritius
Rivière Noire District